The 82nd Regiment of Foot was a British army regiment raised for service in the American Revolutionary War.

The regiment was raised in Lanarkshire, Scotland on 16 December 1777. 
It was sent to New York in August 1779 and then to establish and defend New Ireland in June 1779. It was sent to Wilmington, North Carolina in April 1781 and its light company was interned at Yorktown. It was disbanded in 1784.

References

Infantry regiments of the British Army
Military units and formations established in 1777
Military units and formations disestablished in 1784
Regiments of the British Army in the American Revolutionary War
1777 establishments in Great Britain